Glossop was a Municipal Borough in Derbyshire, England from 1866 to 1974. It was created under the Municipal Corporations Act 1835.

It was enlarged in 1934 when part of the civil parish of Charlesworth was incorporated into the borough.

The borough was abolished in 1974 under the Local Government Act 1972 and combined with the Municipal Borough of Buxton, the urban districts of New Mills and Whaley Bridge and the rural districts of Chapel en le Frith and Tintwistle to form the new High Peak district.

References

Districts of England abolished by the Local Government Act 1972
History of Derbyshire
Glossop